Visitors to Ghana must obtain a visa from one of the Ghanaian diplomatic missions unless they come from one of the countries or territories that are either visa exempt or whose citizens may obtain a visa on arrival.

Visa policy map

Visa exemption 
Citizens of the following 31 countries and territories are not required to obtain a visa to enter Ghana, for a stay up to the duration listed below:

Visa is also not required for holders of a Dual Nationality Card issued by Ghana. Pre-arranged visa may be picked up on arrival.

Holders of diplomatic, official, or service passports issued to nationals of Brazil, China, Cuba, Germany, Iran, Namibia, South Africa and holders of diplomatic passports issued to nationals of Turkey do not require a visa for Ghana.

 and  signed an agreement of abolishing visas for diplomatic and service passports on July 8, 2022.

Visa on arrival
From 1 July 2016 citizens of the African Union (except Morocco) member states that are not visa exempt can obtain a 30 days maximum visa for Ghana upon arrival for fee $150. The arrangement would be piloted at the Kotoka International Airport in Accra for three months, and thereafter extended to all other entry points of the country.

If special requirements are satisfied, the citizens of countries without diplomatic or consular mission of Ghana travelling on short notice may obtain a visa on arrival.

Visa is granted on arrival for holders of a copy of a pre-arranged approval from immigration.

As part of the Year of Return, Ghana 2019, all visitors to Ghana are able to obtain a visa on arrival during December 2019 and January 2020.

E-visa
Ghana plans to introduce e-Visas in 2019.

See also

 Visa requirements for Ghanaian citizens

References

External links

Ghana
Foreign relations of Ghana